Eduardo Puertollano (born 25 February 1934) is a former Uruguayan cyclist. He competed in three events at the 1956 Summer Olympics.

References

1934 births
Living people
Uruguayan male cyclists
Olympic cyclists of Uruguay
Cyclists at the 1956 Summer Olympics
Sportspeople from Montevideo
Pan American Games medalists in cycling
Pan American Games silver medalists for Uruguay
Competitors at the 1959 Pan American Games
Medalists at the 1959 Pan American Games